Vicksburg is a census-designated place located in Buffalo Township, Union County in the state of Pennsylvania, United States. It is located between the boroughs of Mifflinburg and Lewisburg along Pennsylvania Route 45. As of the 2010 census the population was 261 residents.

References

Census-designated places in Union County, Pennsylvania
Census-designated places in Pennsylvania